The 1988–89 Major Indoor Soccer League season was the eleventh in league history and would end with the San Diego Sockers repeating as MISL champions. It was the Sockers' seventh indoor title in eight NASL and MISL seasons. The Sockers would win seventh games in both the semifinals and championship series.

Recap
The league very nearly did not make it to the fall of 1988 as both labor negotiations and rising costs threatened to fold the league. The St. Louis Steamers, Minnesota Strikers, Cleveland Force and Chicago Sting dropped out over the course of the summer. Plans for a 60-game schedule were scrapped, and a new labor agreement was signed on July 16.

The remaining seven teams would play a 48-game schedule that would see the top five teams qualify for the playoffs. The fourth and fifth-place teams would play each other, while the first-place team would play the winner in the league semifinals. The second and third-place teams played in the other semifinal, and the semifinal winners would play in the league championship series.

After the season, the Los Angeles Lazers  folded and new franchises were placed in St. Louis and Cleveland for the 1989–90 season.

Teams

Regular Season Schedule

The 1988–89 regular season schedule ran from November 4, 1988, to April 18, 1989. At 48 games, it was a decrease of eight games per team compared to the previous season.

Final standings

Playoffs

Wildcard Series

Semifinals

Championship Series

Regular Season Player Statistics

Scoring leaders

GP = Games Played, G = Goals, A = Assists, Pts = Points

Leading goalkeepers

Note: GP = Games played; Min – Minutes played; GA = Goals against; GAA = Goals against average; W = Wins; L = Losses

Playoff Player Statistics

Scoring leaders

GP = Games Played, G = Goals, A = Assists, Pts = Points

Leading goalkeepers

Note: GP = Games played; Min – Minutes played; GA = Goals against; GAA = Goals against average; W = Wins; L = Losses

All-MISL Teams

League awards
Most Valuable Player: Preki, Tacoma

Scoring Champion: Preki, Tacoma

Pass Master: Preki, Tacoma/Chico Borja, Wichita

Defender of the Year: Kevin Crow, San Diego

Rookie of the Year: Rusty Troy, Baltimore

Newcomer of the Year: Domenic Mobilio, Baltimore

Goalkeeper of the Year: Victor Nogueira, San Diego

Coach of the Year: Kenny Cooper, Baltimore

Championship Series Most Valuable Player: Victor Nogueira, San Diego

Championship Series Unsung Hero: Paul Daugherty, San Diego

Team Attendance Totals

References

External links
 1988-89 summary at The MISL: A Look Back
 1989 page - Dallas Sidekicks Memorial Archive
 The Year in American Soccer - 1989

Major Indoor Soccer League (1978–1992) seasons
Major
Major